Monté Ross (born August 11, 1970) is an American college basketball coach, currently an assistant coach at Temple University. He previously served as the head men's basketball coach at the University of Delaware. Ross has two children: Justin and Lauren. He is married to Michelle Ross.

Head coaching record

References

1970 births
Living people
American men's basketball coaches
American men's basketball players
Basketball coaches from Pennsylvania
Basketball players from Philadelphia
College men's basketball head coaches in the United States
Delaware Fightin' Blue Hens men's basketball coaches
Drexel Dragons men's basketball coaches
Lehigh Mountain Hawks men's basketball coaches
Saint Joseph's Hawks men's basketball coaches
Winston-Salem State Rams men's basketball players
Guards (basketball)
Sportspeople from Philadelphia